Rain Effect is the sixth Korean-language studio album (seventh overall) by South Korean entertainer Rain. It was released on January 2, 2014, by Cube DC and distributed by LOEN Entertainment.  It is his first studio album in 6 years, since Rainism in 2008, and his first musical release since the first EP Back to the Basic in 2010. Rain Effect contains a total of ten tracks, including the double lead singles "30 Sexy" and "La Song".

Like most of his releases (since leaving JYP Entertainment), the album is said to be mostly written and produced by Rain himself along with Bae Jin-ryeol (JR Groove), Jung Wooyoung and Hwang Hye Kyung. HyunA participated as the album's only featured artist.

Background
Details of Rain's comeback had been speculated about even before he was discharged from the military. Many articles predicted that Rain was signing with both Cube Entertainment (in Asia) and Roc Nation (Internationally). On September 17, it was officially announced that Rain had signed an exclusive deal with Cube DC. With that announcement, Cube Entertainment confirmed a Zepp Tour in Japan and appearances at a MCM store opening in Singapore, BAZAAR Men People of the Year ceremony in China and a fan meeting in South Korea. Rain delivered a special performance at the 2013 MAMA, where a trailer teasing an upcoming reality show and new album was revealed.

According to an official from Cube Entertainment, Rain Effect is mostly written and produced by Rain himself. Similarly to his previous albums, he will have many collaboration tracks with respected composers including Bae Jin-ryeol. As the album progressed, Rain had been very involved in the album's planning (clothes, choreography, music, etc.). In the statement, Cube stated that "He [Rain] is known to show enthusiasm for the job by presiding over meetings to provide his fans with the best-quality album possible."

Release
After Rain's performance at 2013 MAMA, a trailer aired with the date "2014.01.06" and the phrase "Rain will fall, again." In December, links on various digital music portals as well as South Korean and international music retails began open for album pre-orders. The album was originally to be released on January 6, but due to his film schedule for The Prince, the date was pushed up to January 2.

Rain Effect was released physically and digitally on January 2, 2014. The album peaked at number 1 on the Gaon Albums Chart.

On February 3, Cube DC announced that a special edition of the album would be release, digitally on February 7 and physically on February 11, with a new song titled "I Love You", a 64-page booklet and a 36-page notebook with Rain's personal stories.

On June 6, 2014, to celebrate the birthday of her labelmate HyunA, he released "Where You Going Oppa?" as the fourth single from the album and first from the special album "Colour Me Red", released in October 2014.

Teasers
On December 30, Rain released teaser on his official Twitter for both "30 Sexy" and "La Song".

Singles

"30 Sexy"
A music video teaser for "30 Sexy" was unveiled on December 30, 2013, the same day he released image teasers for it. Being one of the two title tracks, "30 Sexy" is said to be similar to "Ways to Avoid the Sun" and will showcase his vocals as well as "sexy and mature charms". On New Year's Day, LOEN Entertainment released the official video directed by direction team The Lumpens whom directed for Cho Yong Pil's "Bounce", the same day as the "La Song" video. The video is performance-based utilizing 3D designs and light and visual effects to illustrate the choreography done by in both group and solo performance shots. Upon its release, "30 Sexy" charted within the top ten of the South Korean online music charts including MelOn, Mnet, Bugs, Soribada and Naver Music. A few days later, the song debuted at number twenty-two on Gaon Singles Chart  and number eight on Billboard K-Pop Hot 100. It eventually peaked at number twelve on the Gaon Single Chart. This song won the first place on televised K-pop music shows like Mnet's M! Countdown on January 9.

"La Song"
The same day image teasers and a music video teaser for "30 Sexy" was released, a music video teaser for "La Song" on December 30, 2013. "La Song" has described as "a fusion of old school hip hop, electronica, rock and funk music". 
along with the official video for "30 Sexy", LOEN Entertainment released the official video for "La Song," also directed by The Lumpens. The video showcases Rain in a multicultural, bohemian world dancing with various groups of people. Upon its release, "La Song" charted within the top twenty of the South Korean online music charts including MelOn, Mnet, Bugs, Soribada and Naver Music. A few days later, the song debuted at number nineteen on Gaon Singles Chart before eventually peaking at number nine.  It debuted at number twenty on Billboard K-Pop Hot 100 before peaking at number nine the following week.  This song won the first place on televised K-pop music shows like KBS's Music Bank on January 10.

"I Love You"
In a tweet on Twitter, Cube DC announced a special edition of the album with the release of a new title track called "I Love You". A music video for the song was released on February 7.

Promotion
Rain began promoting the album with an interview and performances of "LA SONG" and "Marilyn Monroe" on The Cultwo Show on SBS Power FM.
Rain began promoting his comeback album on various music programs, starting on the January 9, 2014, broadcast of Mnet's M! Countdown. This was followed by performances on KBS's Music Bank, MBC's Music Core, SBS's The Music Trend and SBS MTV's The Show. He performed a special stage at the Golden Disk Awards.

Along with music program performances, Rain will be having a musical showcase broadcast on Mnet on January 9, the same day as his M! Countdown comeback. Mnet began teasing the special by releasing two trailers leading up to the special. The special comeback show titled RAIN COMEBACK SPECIAL: RAIN EFFECT at the CJ E&M Studio on January 8, 2014, performing his brand-new songs including "30 SEXY", "LA SONG", "Marilyn Monroe", and "Dear Mama, Don't Cry". The show was recorded in private, and aired through the cable channel Mnet on January 9, 2014, at 7:30 pm KST.

On KBS's You Hee-yeol's Sketchbook, Rain performed "30 SEXY" and "LA SONG", alongside his previous hits "It's Raining", "Rainism" and "How To Avoid The Sun".

Accolades

Track listing

Credits and personnel

 Jung Ji Hoon - vocal, songwriter, producer, executive producer
 Bae Jin-ryeol (JR Groove) - producer
 Jung Wooyoung - producer
 Hwang Hye Kyung - producer

Chart performance

Album charts

Charted songs

Release history

References

External links
 
 
 
 

Rain (entertainer) albums
Cube Entertainment albums
Kakao M albums
2014 albums
Korean-language albums